Out of the Box is the second studio album from Joel Turner. It was first planned for release in early 2006 but did not reach stores until 6 October 2007. No reason has been given for the many postponements.

The album was largely produced by UK artist Colin "C-Swing" Emmanuel, with pre-production duties shared by Turner and his Two Kingz Produktionz partner Preech. Following on from Turner's self-titled debut, Out of the Box is again an eclectic mix of styles and features hip-hop blended with undertones of R&B, pop, rock, reggae and techno.

Musically, the album is centered on strong beats, catchy hooks and guitar-based melodies. The lyrical content focuses on a variety of social, political and personal themes, in addition to more lighthearted tracks such as "Dope", "La", "1, 2, 3" and "Going On". Apart from a few short skits and some vocal percussion on songs, the album sees less of an emphasis on beatboxing than its predecessor, with Turner keen to reserve his best material for live performances. Turner also performs vocals, guitar and bass on the album.

Although Turner’s second album saw him marketed for the first time as a solo artist, Out of the Box is in fact a collaboration with various MCs, with Turner’s Modern Day Poets colleagues C4 and KNO featuring the most extensively. Other tracks see contributions from Preech and London-based artist Me-One, while a couple of De La Soul members also appear – Dave Jolicoeur on the track "You" and Posdnous on the remix of Turner's 2004 hit "These Kids". Furthermore, UK rappers Mystro and Torsion (the latter of Da Mighty Elementz) appear on "La" and the anti-war ballad "Why" respectively.

Out of the Box did not make the ARIA top 100 albums chart but reached the top 30 of the urban albums chart. The only single to be released was "City of Dreams", which reached the top 30 of the singles chart in September 2007. During a court case in October 2008, Turner blamed the album's poor sales on insufficient promotion due to being sidelined by an attack that left him with a broken jaw.

Track listing

"Intro" (featuring Me-One)Writers: Joel Turner, Me-OneProducer: Me-One  
"Dope" (featuring C4 & KNO)Writers: Joel Turner, C4, KNOProducer: Colin Emmanuel 
"Don't Feel" (featuring KNO)Writers: Joel Turner, KNOProducer: Colin Emmanuel
"Beat Box Interlude"Writer: Joel TurnerProducer: Joel Turner 
"La" (featuring Mystro)Writers: Joel Turner, Mystro, Colin EmmanuelProducer: Colin Emmanuel
"JBigz Freestyle 1"Writer: Joel TurnerProducers: Two Kingz Produktionz
"City of Dreams" (featuring C4 & KNO)Writers: Joel Turner, C4, KNO, Shaunne DiamondProducer: Colin Emmanuel 
"We're On Fire" (featuring C4 & KNO)Writers: Joel Turner, C4, KNOProducer: Colin Emmanuel
"You" (featuring Dave of De La Soul)Writers: Joel Turner, Dave Jolicoeur, Daniel de Bourg, Colin EmmanuelProducer: Colin Emmanuel
"From the Streets" (featuring KNO & Preech)Writers: Joel Turner, KNO, PreechProducer: Colin Emmanuel 
"1,2,3" (featuring Preech)Writers: Joel Turner, PreechProducers: Two Kingz Produktionz
"Going On" (featuring C4 & KNO)Writers: Joel Turner, C4, KNOProducer: Colin Emmanuel
"Beat Box Night @ the Studio"Writer: Joel TurnerProducer: Cliffhanger
"Why" (featuring Torsion of Da Mighty Elementz & KNO)Writers: Joel Turner, Torsion, KNOProducer: Colin Emmanuel
"Byron" (featuring C4)Writers: Joel Turner, C4, Shaunne DiamondProducer: Colin Emmanuel 
"Battle" (featuring C4 & KNO)Writers: Joel Turner, C4, KNOProducer: Colin Emmanuel 
"Outro"Writers: Joel Turner, Colin EmmanuelProducer: Colin Emmanuel 
"These Kids" Remix (featuring Pos of De La Soul) (bonus track)Writers: Joel Turner, Tim TurnerProducer: Colin Emmanuel

References

External links
 Out of the musical box
 GenerationQ Review

Joel Turner (musician) albums
2007 albums